Glipa annulata is a species of beetle in the genus Glipa. It was described in 1868.

References

annulata
Beetles described in 1868